Martell is an unincorporated community located in the town of Martell, Pierce County, Wisconsin, United States.

Images

References

Unincorporated communities in Pierce County, Wisconsin
Unincorporated communities in Wisconsin